The  is an arboretum located within Hattori Ryokuchi Park at 1-13 Terauchi, Toyonaka, Osaka, Japan. It is open daily. The arboretum contains bamboo gardens and some 2,500 cherry trees planted across the park, including someiyoshino, yamazakura, and oyamazakura varieties.

See also 
 List of botanical gardens in Japan

References 
 Yellow Pages Japan
 Japan Times article
 AsiaRooms article
 Photographs

Arboreta in Japan
Botanical gardens in Japan
Parks and gardens in Osaka Prefecture